Kenneth John Williams (7 January 1918 – 29 November 1977) was an Australian rules footballer who played with Collingwood in the Victorian Football League (VFL).

Notes

External links 

Profile at Collingwood Forever

1918 births
1977 deaths
Australian rules footballers from Victoria (Australia)
Collingwood Football Club players
People from Morwell, Victoria